Cypress-pine is the common name used for three closely related genera of conifers in the cypress family Cupressaceae:

Callitris (Australia)
Actinostrobus (Australia)
Widdringtonia (Southern Africa)

Cupressaceae